Matthias Emich, O. Carm. (died 1480) was a Roman Catholic prelate who served as Auxiliary Bishop of Mainz (1476–1480).

Biography
Matthias Emich was ordained a priest in the Order of the Brothers of the Blessed Virgin Mary of Mount Carmel. On 16 Aug 1476, he was appointed during the papacy of Pope Sixtus IV as Auxiliary Bishop of Mainz and Titular Bishop of Cyrene. On 8 Jun 1477, he was consecrated bishop. He served as Auxiliary Bishop of Mainz until his death on 24 May 1480. While bishop, he was the principal co-consecrator of Ludwig von Helmstatt, Bishop of Speyer (1478).

References

External links and additional sources
 (for Chronology of Bishops) 
 (for Chronology of Bishops)  
 (for Chronology of Bishops) 
 (for Chronology of Bishops)  

15th-century Roman Catholic bishops in the Holy Roman Empire
Bishops appointed by Pope Sixtus IV
1480 deaths
Carmelite bishops